Jake bleskop Milton Green (30 March 1994) is a South African rower.

Green attended St. Andrew's College, Grahamstown and Pretoria University.  In May 2016, Green was selected to represent South Africa at the 2016 Summer Olympics. The South African team almost came in 3rd place but finished in 4th place.

He competed in the men's pair with Luc Daffarn at the 2020 Summer Olympics.

Notes and references

External links
World Rowing Profile

1994 births
Living people
Alumni of St. Andrew's College, Grahamstown
South African male rowers
Olympic rowers of South Africa
Rowers at the 2016 Summer Olympics
Rowers at the 2020 Summer Olympics
21st-century South African people